Below is a list of compositions by Fritz Kreisler sorted by genre.

Original compositions

Operetta 

 Apple Blossoms, operetta / musical (1919); music also by Victor Jacobi
 Lisa, operetta in 3 Acts (published 1969)
 Rhapsody, operetta / Musical (1944)
 Sissy, singspiel in 2 Acts (1932)

Movie songs 
 The King Steps Out (1936)

Vocal 

 The Bonnie Earl O'Moray (published 1917); lyrics by Reinhold von Warlich
 Cradle Song (published 1915); based on Caprice Viennois
 Drei Nachtgesänge (Three Night Songs) (published 1921); on poems of Joseph Freiherr von Eichendorff
 Leezie Lindsay (published 1917); lyrics by Reinhold von Warlich
 Love Comes and Goes (published 1934); based on Liebesleid; lyrics by Geraldine Farrar
 Madly in Love (published 1936); lyrics by Dorothy Fields
 The Old Sweet Song, duet for soprano and baritone (or tenor) (published 1915); based on Caprice Viennois; lyrics by J. Kilp
 O salutaris hostia (published 1916); after Louis Couperin; lyrics by Alice Mattullath
 O sanctissima (published 1916); freely adapted from a melody by Arcangelo Corelli; lyrics by Alice Mattullath
 The Praise of Islay (published 1917); lyrics by Reinhold von Warlich
 The Shepherd's Madrigal (published 1937); lyrics by Geraldine Farrar
 Stars in My Eyes (published 1936); lyrics by Dorothy Fields
 The Whole World Knows, a Viennese Love Song (published 1934); based on Caprice Viennois; lyrics by Geraldine Farrar

Piano 

 Liebesfreud (Love's Joy) (published 1911)
 The Old Refrain, Viennese popular song (published 1919)
 Petit valse (published 1927)

String quartet 

 String Quartet in A minor (premiered 1919; published 1921)

Cello and piano 

 Allegretto in the Style of Boccherini (published 1910)
 Andantino in the Style of Martini (published 1910)
 Chanson Louis XIII et Pavane in the Style of Couperin (published 1910)
 Sicilienne and Rigaudon in the Style of Francœur (published 1910)

Solo violin 

 Austrian Imperial Hymn Gott erhalte unseren Kaiser (published 1915)
 Recitative and Scherzo-Caprice for Solo Violin, Op. 6 (published 1911)
 Study on a Choral in the style of Johann Stamitz (published 1930)

Original cadenzas 

 Beethoven Violin Concerto in D major, Op. 61 (published 1928); 3 cadenzas
 Brahms Violin Concerto in D major, Op. 77 (published 1928)
 Mozart Violin Concerto No. 3 in G major, K.216 (published 1946); 3 cadenzas
 Mozart Violin Concerto No. 4 in D major, K.218 (published 1946); 3 cadenzas
 Mozart Violin Concerto No. 5 in A major, K.219 (published 1946); 3 cadenzas
 Mozart Violin Concerto No. 6 in E major, K. 268 (published 1946)
 Paganini Violin Concerto No. 1 in D major, Op.6, written for the arrangement / re-orchestration of I. Allegro maestoso (1936)
 Viotti Violin Concerto No. 22 in A minor (published 1966)

Violin and orchestra 

 Violin Concerto in C major in the style of Vivaldi (also arranged for violin and piano - see below)
(I. Allegro energico ma non troppo; II. Andante doloroso; III. Allegro molto)

Violin and piano

Transcriptions and arrangements

Piano trio 
 "Farewell to Cucullain" (The Londonderry Air), traditional tune arranged for violin, cello and piano by Kreisler and his brother, Hugo, a cellist (published 1922)

Violin and orchestra 
 Concerto in one movement after Paganini's Violin Concerto Op.6, new cadenza / arrangement / re-orchestration of Violin Concerto No.1 in D (E-flat) major, Op. 6, MS 21: I. Allegro Maestoso (published 1936)

Violin and piano 
{| class="wikitable sortable" style="margins:auto; width=95%;"
! width="155"|Original composer !! width="285"|Title !! width="50"|Publ.date !! Remarks
|-
| valign="top" rowspan="2" | Albéniz, Isaac || Malagueña || align=center|1927 || original for piano: Op. 165, No. 3
|-
| Tango in D major || align=center|1927 || original for piano: Op. 165, No. 2
|-
| valign="top" rowspan="2" | Bach, Johann Sebastian || Gavotte in E major || align=center|1913 || original title Gavotte en rondeau from Partita No. 3, BWV1006 for solo violin
|-
| Prelude in E major || align=center|1913 || original from Partita No. 3, BWV1006 for solo violin
|-
| valign="top" rowspan="2" | Balogh, Ernő || Caprice antique || align=center|1924 ||  
|-
| Dirge of the North || align=center|1924 ||  
|-
| Brahms, Johannes || Hungarian Dance No. 17 in F minor || align=center|  || original for piano 4-hands
|-
| Berlin, Irving || Blue Skies || align=center|1927 ||  
|-
| Brandl, Johann || The Old Refrain (Du alter Stephansturm) || align=center|1905 || traditional Viennese popular song
|-
| Chaminade, Cécile || Sérénade Espagnole || align=center|  || original for piano
|-
| valign="top" rowspan="2" | Chopin, Frédéric || Mazurka No. 23 in D major, Op. 33, No. 2 || align=center|1923 || original for piano
|-
| Mazurka No. 45 in A minor, Op. 67, No. 4 || align=center|1915 || original for piano
|-
| valign="top" rowspan="2" | Corelli, Arcangelo || La Folia, Op. 5, No. 12 || align=center|  || original for violin and cembalo
|-
| Sarabande and Allegretto || align=center|1913 ||  
|-
| Dawes, Charles Gate || Melody in A major (1912) || align=center|1912 ||  
|-
| valign="top" rowspan="8" | Dvořák, Antonín || Humoresque || align=center|1906 || original for piano: Op. 101, No. 7
|-
| Indian Lament in G minor || align=center|1914 || original  for violin and piano: Larghetto of Sonatina, Op. 100
|-
| Negro Spiritual Melody || align=center|1914 || from the Largo of the New World Symphony, Op. 95
|-
| Songs My Mother Taught Me || align=center|1914 || original for voice and piano: Když mne stará matka spívat, Op. 55, No. 4
|-
| Slavonic Dance No. 1 in G minor || align=center|1914 || original for piano 4-hands: arranged from Slavonic Dances, Op. 46, No. 2 and Op. 72, No. 1 (ded. Achille Rivarde)
|-
| Slavonic Dance No. 2 in E minor || align=center|1914 || original for piano 4-hands: Op. 72, No. 2
|-
| Slavonic Dance No. 3 in G major || align=center|1914 || original for piano 4-hands: Op. 72, No. 8
|-
| Slavonic Fantasie in B minor || align=center|1914 || original themes from Songs My Mother Taught Me Op. 55 No. 4 and 4 Romantic Pieces Op. 75
|-
| Falla, Manuel de || Danse espagnole || align=center|1926 || Danza I (from Act II Scene I) of the opera La vida breve|-
| Foster, Stephen || Old Folks at Home (Swanee River) || align=center|1925 || original for voice and piano
|-
| Friml, Rudolf || La Danse des demoiselles, Op. 48 || align=center|  ||  
|-
| Gärtner, Eduard || Aus Wien (Viennese Melody) || align=center|1915 ||  
|-
| Glazunov, Alexander || Sérénade espagnole, Op. 20, No. 2 || align=center|  || original for cello and orchestra
|-
| Gluck, Christoph Willibald || Mélodie (Dance of the Blessed Spirits) || align=center|1913 || original from the 1774 version of Orphée et Eurydice|-
| Godowsky, Leopold || Nocturnal Tangier || align=center|  || original for piano: from Triakontameron (1919)
|-
| Grainger, Percy || Molly on the Shore (Irish reel) || align=center|1924 || original for string quartet or string orchestra
|-
| Granados, Enrique || Danse espagnole (Spanish Dance No. 5) in E minor || align=center|1915 || original for piano: No.5 Andaluza from Danzas españolas, Op. 37
|-
| Handel, George Frideric || Ombra mai fu, Largo || align=center|  || from the opera Serse|-
| valign="top" rowspan="2" | Haydn, Joseph || Gott erhalte unseren Kaiser || align=center|1915 || Austrian National Anthem
|-
| Hungarian Rondò || align=center|1945 || original from Piano Trio in G major, Hob.XV:25 'Gypsy'
|-
| Heuberger, Richard || Midnight Bells || align=center|1923 || from the operetta Der Opernball (1898)
|-
| Hughes, Herbert || I saw from the beach (Irish melodies, Vol 6, nº12) || align=center|  || original melody by Thomas Moore, arranged for violin, voice and piano
|-
| Korngold, Erich Wolfgang || Tanzlied des Pierrot || align=center|1920 || from the opera Die tote Stadt, Op. 12 (1920)
|-
| Krakauer, Alexander || Im Paradies (Paradise) || align=center|1922 || Viennese folk-song
|-
| Leclair, Jean-Marie || Tambourin || align=center|1913 || original from the Violin Sonata No. 3 in D major, Op. 9, No. 3 "Tombeau"|-
| Lehár, Franz || Serenade from Frasquita || align=center|1927 || from the operetta Frasquita|-
| Liliuokalani || Aloha Oe || align=center|1925 || Hawaiian melody
|-
| Logan, Frederic Knight || Pale Moon, Indian Love Song || align=center|1923 ||  
|-
| Mendelssohn, Felix || Lied ohne Worte: May Breezes || align=center|1913 || original for piano: Op. 62, No. 1 (1844)
|-
| Mozart, Wolfgang Amadeus || Rondo || align=center|1913 || original for orchestra from the Haffner Serenade, K.250/248b
|-
| Ethelbert Nevin || The Rosary (1898) || align=center|1917 ||  
|-
| Owen, Elwyn || Invocation || align=center|  ||  
|-
| valign="top" rowspan="2" | Paderewski, Ignacy Jan || Melody || align=center|1923 || original for piano: Op. 16, No. 2
|-
| Paraphrase on Paderewski's Famous Menuet || align=center|1917 || original for piano: Op. 14, No. 1
|-
| valign="top" rowspan="8" | Paganini, Niccolò || La Campanella (The Bell), Op. 7 || align=center|  || original for violin and orchestra
|-
| Caprice No. 13 in B major || align=center|1913 || original for violin solo
|-
| Caprice No. 20 in D major || align=center|1913 || original for violin solo
|-
| Caprice No. 24 in A minor || align=center|1913 || original for violin solo
|-
| Moto Perpetuo in C major, Op. 11 || align=center|  || original for violin and orchestra
|-
| Le Streghe (The Witches' Dance), Op. 8 || align=center|  || original for violin and orchestra
|-
| Theme and Variations: I Palpiti, Op. 13 || align=center|  || original for violin and orchestra
|-
| Theme and Variations: Non più mesta, Op. 12 || align=center|  || original for violin and orchestra
|-
| Poldini, Ede || Poupée valsante (Dancing Doll) || align=center|1924 || No. 2 from Marionettes, 7 Piano pieces
|-
| valign="top" rowspan="8" | Rachmaninoff, Sergei || Daisies || align=center|  || original for voice and piano: Маргаритки, Op. 38, No. 3 (1916)
|-
| Polka Italienne || align=center|  || original for piano
|-
| Preghiera (Prayer) || align=center|1940 || original from the Piano Concerto No. 2|-
| 18th Variation from Paganini Rhapsody || align=center|  || original for piano and orchestra
|-
| 6 Romances, Op. 4: No. 3, V molchan'i nochi taynoy (When night descends) || align=center|  || for voice, violin and piano; English version by Edward Agate
|-
| 6 Romances, Op. 4: No. 4, Ne poy, krasavitsa, pri mne (Oh, cease thy singing, Maiden fair) || align=center|  || for voice, violin and piano; English version by John McCormack
|-
| 15 Romances, Op. 26: No. 7, K detyam (To the children) || align=center|  || for voice, violin and piano; English version by Rosa Newmarch
|-
| 15 Romances, Op. 26: No. 10, U moyego okna (Before my window) || align=center|  || for voice, violin and piano; English version by Rosa Newmarch
|-
| Rameau, Jean-Philippe || Tambourin || align=center|1913 || from the opera Les fêtes d'Hébé|-
| Ravel, Maurice || Habanera (Rapsodie espagnole: 2nd movt.) || align=center|1928 ||  
|-
| Renk, Fritz || To a Pickaninny || align=center|1924 ||  
|-
| valign="top" rowspan="5" | Rimsky-Korsakov, Nikolai || Fantasy on Two Russian Themes, Op. 33 || align=center|  || original for violin and orchestra: Фантазиа на русские темы
|-
| Song of India (Chanson hindoue) (1897) || align=center|1919 || from the Opera Sadko|-
| Hymn to the Sun || align=center|1919 || from the Opera Le Coq d'Or|-
| No.1 Danse orientale || align=center|1922 || from Scheherazade|-
| No.2 Chanson arabe || align=center|1922 || from Scheherazade|-
| Roeder, Edward || Wooden Shoe Dance, Op. 2 || align=center|1923 ||  
|-
| Schelling, Ernest || Irlandaise || align=center|1928 ||  
|-
| valign="top" rowspan="3" | Schubert, Franz || Ballet Music No. 2 || align=center|1913 || from Rosamunde von Cypern|-
| Impromptu in G-flat major || align=center|1913 || original for piano: Op. 90, No. 3, D.899
|-
| Moment musical in F minor || align=center|1913 || original for piano: Op. 94, No. 3, D.780
|-
| Schumann, Robert || Romanze in A major || align=center|1913 || original for oboe and piano: Op. 94, No. 2
|-
| Scott, Cyril || Lotus Land || align=center|1922 || original for piano: Op. 47, No. 1
|-
| valign="top" rowspan="2" | Tartini, Giuseppe || Fugue in A major || align=center|1913 ||  
|-
| Sonata in G minor "The Devil's Trill" || align=center|  || original for solo violin (with figured bass accompaniment), Violin Sonata in G minor, B.g5; the Cadenza is composed by Kreisler
|-
| valign="top" rowspan="4" | Tchaikovsky, Pyotr Ilyich || Andante cantabile || align=center|1925 || from String Quartet No. 1 in D major, Op. 11 (1871)
|-
| Chanson sans paroles in F major || align=center|1924 || original for piano: No. 3 from Souvenir de Hapsal, Op. 2 (1867)
|-
| Humoresque || align=center|1926 || original for piano: No. 2 from 2 Morceaux, Op. 10 (1871)
|-
| Scherzo || align=center|192? || original for violin piano: No. 2 from Souvenir d'un lieu cher, Op. 42 (1878) -Revised & Edited by Kreisler-
|-
| valign="top" rowspan="2" | Traditional || Farewell to Cucullain (The Londonderry Air) || align=center|1922 || old Irish melody
|-
| Russian Folk Songs (2) || align=center|1925 || Paraphrase on "Volga Boatman's Song" and "A Folk Song"
|-
| Weber, Carl Maria von || Larghetto || align=center|1913 || from Violin Sonata No. 1
|-
| valign="top" rowspan="2" | Wieniawski, Henryk || Caprice in A minor || align=center|1913 || originally for violin solo or violin duet: No. 4 from 8 Études-Caprices, Op. 18
|-
| Caprice in E major "Alla salterella" || align=center|1913 || originally for violin solo: No. 5 from L'Ecole Moderne, Op. 10
|}

 Kreisler as editor 
 Ernest Schelling – Concerto for violin and orchestra (1916)
 Robert Schumann – Fantasie'' in C major for violin and orchestra, Op. 131

See also 
 Musical hoax

Notes

References 
 Fritz Kreisler Collection at the Library of Congress
 WorldCat

 
Kreisler, Fritz, List of compositions by